Amanineteyerike (Amanneteyerike, Aman-nete-yerike, Irike-Amannote) was a Kushite King of Meroe. His reign is dated to the end of the 5th century BCE.

Amanineteyerike took on a full set of titles based on those of the Egyptian Pharaohs.

Horus name: Khanakht Khaemwaset ("Mighty Bull appearing in Thebes"); Mortuary name (?) Hortawy 
Nebty Name: Ittawyneb ("Seizer of every land"); Mortuary name (?) Merymaat 
Golden Horus Name: Uafkhesutneb(ut) ("Subduer of every land"); Mortuary name (?) Irymaat 
Prenomen:  Neferibre ("Re is one whose heart is beautiful")
Nomen: Amanineteyerike ( 'rk-Imn-nwty) ("Begotten of Amun of No(=Thebes)")

Amanineteyerike was the son of King Malewiebamani, and brother of Baskakeren. His predecessor Talakhamani was either an older brother or an uncle. He was buried at the royal cemetery in Nuri (Nuri 12).

References

5th-century BC monarchs of Kush